"Shepherd's Guide" is the title given to several books, that were published to help shepherds identify stray herds. The books depict patterns of sheep marking, in the ear and on the wool, and name their owner with her/his residence.

One of the earliest Shepherd's Guide was prepared for parts of Cumberland by Joseph Walker, in 1817. Hosgson's 1849 Guide was delivered to a list of subscribers, while Gate's new shepherd's guide for Cumberland, Westmoreland, and Lancashire, of 1879, has numerous pages of advertisements. While all of those feature a detailed engraving of sheep (repeated with different marks), the books from the late 19th and 20th centuries have a line sketch. Some were designed as pocket-books, and others were bigger. The later books are attributed to various farmer associations, and cover a wider perimeter.

The books are useful as a genealogical and local history resource, and as collectibles.

List of Shepherd's Guides

References

External links
Selections from  Daniel Gate's Shepherd's Guide, 1879
Full digitized copy of Gate's Guide (mostly BW)

Agriculture books
North East England
Handbooks and manuals
Sheep farming in the United Kingdom
English books